Medieval Serbian architecture is preserved in Serbian Orthodox monasteries and churches. There were several architectural styles that were used in the buildings and structures of Serbia in the Middle Ages, such as:

Raška architectural school (Raška style),  1170–1300
Vardar architectural school (Vardar style), fl. 1300–1389
Morava architectural school (Morava style), fl. 1370–1459

See also

Medieval Serbian art

 
Arch
Cultural history of Serbia
Serbian architectural styles